Hungary competed at the 2018 Winter Olympics in PyeongChang, South Korea, from 9 to 25 February 2018. With the men's 5000 metre relay victory in short track speed skating, the nation had won its first ever Winter Olympic gold, and first Winter medal since 1980. Hungarian athletes have participated in all Winter Olympic Games.

Medalists

Competitors
The following is the list of number of competitors participating at the Games per sport/discipline.

Alpine skiing 

Hungary qualified four athletes, two male and two female, and one team.

Mixed

Cross-country skiing 

Hungary qualified two athletes, one male and one female.

Distance

Sprint

Figure skating 

Hungary qualified one female figure skater, based on its placement at the 2017 World Figure Skating Championships in Helsinki, Finland.

Freestyle skiing

Halfpipe

Short track speed skating 

According to the ISU Special Olympic Qualification Rankings, Hungary qualified a full squad of 5 men and 5 women each.

Men

Women

Qualification legend: ADV – Advanced due to being impeded by another skater; FA – Qualify to medal round; FB – Qualify to consolation round; AA – Advance to medal round due to being impeded by another skaterround

Speed skating

Hungary earned the following quotas at the conclusion of the four World Cups used for qualification.

References

Nations at the 2018 Winter Olympics
2018
Winter Olympics